Leucanopsis rosetta is a moth of the family Erebidae. It was described by William Schaus in 1896. It is found in Brazil.

References

rosetta
Moths described in 1896